Scapania paludicola is a species of liverwort belonging to the family Scapaniaceae.

It is native to the Northern Hemisphere.

References

Scapaniaceae